Fallsbury Township is one of the 25 townships of Licking County, Ohio, United States. As of the 2010 census the population was 981, up from 865 at the 2000 census.

Geography
Located in the northeastern corner of the county, it borders the following townships:
Jackson Township, Knox County - north
Perry Township, Coshocton County - northeast
Pike Township, Coshocton County - east
Perry Township - south
Mary Ann Township - southwest corner
Eden Township - west
Clay Township, Knox County - northwest corner

No municipalities are located in Fallsbury Township.

Name and history
It is the only Fallsbury Township statewide.

Government
The township is governed by a three-member board of trustees, who are elected in November of odd-numbered years to a four-year term beginning on the following January 1. Two are elected in the year after the presidential election and one is elected in the year before it. There is also an elected township fiscal officer, who serves a four-year term beginning on April 1 of the year after the election, which is held in November of the year before the presidential election. Vacancies in the fiscal officership or on the board of trustees are filled by the remaining trustees.

References

External links
County website

Townships in Licking County, Ohio
Townships in Ohio